Mjølhus is a village in Froland municipality in Agder county, Norway. The village is located on the west shore of the river Nidelva, just north of the municipal centre of Blakstad-Osedalen.

References

Villages in Agder
Froland